Rehana Jolly is a Bangladeshi film actress. She won the Bangladesh National Film Awards for her role in the film Ma O Chele. She started her acting career with the film Maa O Chhele. Since 1985 she has acted over 400 films.

Notable films
 Ma o Chhele (1985)
 Nishpap
 Biraj Bou
 Prem Protigga
 Golmaal
 Moharani
 Chetona
 Prayoshchitto
 Unknown Love (2015)
 Ohongkar (2017)
 My Darling (2018)

Awards

References

External links
 

Living people
Bangladeshi film actresses
Best Supporting Actress National Film Award (Bangladesh) winners
Year of birth missing (living people)